Biedrzychowice may refer to the following places in Poland:
Biedrzychowice, Lower Silesian Voivodeship (south-west Poland)
Biedrzychowice, Opole Voivodeship (south-west Poland)